The Bronfman family is a Canadian family, known for its extensive business holdings. It owes its initial fame to Samuel Bronfman (1889–1971), the most influential Canadian Jew of the mid-20th century, who made a fortune in the alcoholic distilled beverage business during American prohibition through founding the Seagram Company, and who later became president of the Canadian Jewish Congress (1939–62).

The family is of Russian-Jewish and Romanian-Jewish ancestry; the patriarch, Yechiel (Ekiel) Bronfman, was originally a tobacco farmer from Bessarabia. According to The New York Times staff reporter Nathaniel Popper, the Bronfman family is "perhaps the single largest force in the Jewish charitable world."

Family tree 
Some of the family members include:

 Abraham Bronfman
 Yechiel (Ekiel) Bronfman (16 Nov 1855, Russia – 24 Dec 1919),  1880 to Mindel Elman (25 May 1863 – 11 Nov 1918)
 Abe Bronfman (15 Nov 1882, Russia – 1968), m. 1905 to Sophie Rasminsky ( 1967.)
 Zelia Bronfman
 Rona Bronfman
 Mildred Bronfman
 Beatrice Bronfman
 Ruth Bronfman 
 Harry Bronfman (20 Mar 1885, Russia – 1963), m. 1905 to Ann Gallaman (d. 1970)
 Allan Bronfman (1906 – 1944), m. 1931 to Freda Besner
 Mitchell Bronfman
 Marion Bronfman
 Beverly Bronfman   
 Gerald Bronfman
 Rona Retta Bronfman
 Laura Bronfman (1 Jan 1887, Russia – 1976), m. 1911 to Barnett Aaron
 Samuel Miles Bronfman Sr. (1 Mar 1889, onboard ship in Soroki, Bessarabia – 10 Jul 1971, Montreal, QC), m. 20 Jun 1922, Winnipeg, MB, to Saidye Rosner Bronfman (20 Dec 1896, Plum Coulee, MB – 6 Jul 1995, Montreal, QC)
 Aileen Mindel (Minda) Bronfman (1925 – 1985), m. 1953, Paris, France, to Alain Francois De Gunzburg
 Phyllis Barbara Bronfman Lambert (1927 – ), m. Jean Lambert
 Edgar Miles Bronfman, Sr. (1929 – 2013), m. 1953–1973 to Ann Margaret Loeb; m. 1973–1974 to Carolyn Townshend; m. Rita "Georgianna" Eileen Webb (dates unknown); m. 1994 to Jan Aronson.
 Samuel Bronfman II
 Edgar Miles Bronfman, Jr. (b. 1955), m. 1979–1991 to Sherry Brewer; m. 1993 to Clarisa Alcock San Román
 Benjamin Zachary Bronfman (b. 1982)
 Vanessa Sherry Bronfman
 Hannah Marcina Bronfman (b. 1987)
 Holly Bronfman
 Matthew Bronfman
 Jeremy Bronfman
 Eli Bronfman
 Adam Rodgers Bronfman
 Sara Rosner Bronfman (b. 1976), m. Basit Igtet (b. 1970)
 Clare Bronfman (b. 1979)
 Charles Rosner Bronfman, m. Barbara Baerwald; m. 1982–2006 Andrea Brett Morrison (1945 – 2006); m. 2008–2011 to Bonita Roche; m. 2012 to Rita Mayo.
 Stephen Bronfman
Coby Bronfman (b. 2005), the fifth son of Matthew Bronfman.
 Ellen Bronfman
 Jennie Bronfman (b. 3 Feb 1891, Manitoba, Canada)  
 Bess Bronfman (b. 2 Mar 1893, Manitoba – 1980), m. 1916–1940 to Harry Louis Druxerman (1887–1940); m. 1954–1964 to Harry Soforenko (d. 1964)
 Alvin Druxerman
 Jacquelyn Blanche Druxerman
 Allan Bronfman (2 Jan 1896, Manitoba – 26 Mar 1980, Montreal, QC), m. 28 Jun 1922, Ottawa, ON, to Lucy Bilsky
 Mona Bronfman (1923 – 1950), m. 1947. 
 Edward Maurice Bronfman (1927 – 2005) 
 Peter Frederick Bronfman (1929 – 1 Dec 1996, Toronto, ON), m. 1976.
 Bruce Bronfman
 Linda Bronfman
 Brenda Bronfman
 Rose Bronfman (3 Feb 1898, Manitoba – 31 May 1988), m. 24 Jun 1922, Winnipeg, MB, to Maxwell Rady (24 Nov 1899 – 3 Mar 1964) 
 Mindel Rady (married name: Olenick)
 Marjorie Rady (b. 1929), m. Morley Blankstein
 Ernest Rady (b. 1937), m. Evelyn

Early history 
The name Bronfman (Yiddish:  "בראָנפמאַן bronfman = bronfn + man) comes from Yiddish בראָנפֿן bronfn, 'liquor, whisky/whiskey, spirits', which is cognate with German Branntwein (in Germany the term refers to any distilled spirits), Dutch brandewijn (which became English brandywine, i.e., 'brandy'), and Afrikaans brandewyn, plus Yiddish מאַן  man, 'man'; it coincidently translates to 'spirits man', referring to one who makes or sells whiskey. The Bronfman family in Canada began with tobacco farmer Yechiel Bronfman (aka Ekiel Bronfman; 16 November 1855, Russia – 24 December 1919) and his wife, Mindel (née Elman; 25 May 1863 – 11 Nov 1918), who emigrated from Moldova to Canada with their children in 1889, escaping the anti-Semitic pogroms of Imperial Russia.

In addition to the famed Samuel Bronfman, Yechiel and Mindel's children at the time of emigration included Abe (15 March 1882, Russia – 16 March 1968, Safety Harbor, Florida), Harry (15 March 1886, Russia – 12 November 1963, Montreal,  QC), and Laura Bronfman (1 Jan 1887, Russia – 1976); in total they had 8 children.

The family settled at a homestead near Wapella, Saskatchewan, but soon moved to Brandon, Manitoba. In 1903, the family borrowed money to buy a hotel (the Anglo-American Hotel) in Emerson, Manitoba, which turned out to be profitable due to railway construction. In 1906, the family moved to Winnipeg. With the advent of Prohibition in Canada, Samuel and his brothers turned their energy towards selling mail-order liquor. Following the government's crack-down on the business, the brothers took another route: as it was still legal to sell alcohol as medicine, the brothers rebranded their liquor using names like "Liver & Kidney Cure", "Dandy Bracer–Liver", and "Rock-A-Bye Cough Cure." Samuel took control of the business after prohibition came to an end in the United States, and was known as "Mr. Sam".

Business and philanthropy 
According to The New York Times staff reporter Nathaniel Popper, the Bronfman family is "perhaps the single largest force in the Jewish charitable world." The family owes its initial fame to Samuel Bronfman (1889–1971), who made a fortune in the alcoholic distilled beverage business during American prohibition through founding the Seagram Company, and who later became president of the Canadian Jewish Congress (1939–62).

Saidye Bronfman, Samuel's wife, was president of the Young Women’s Hebrew Association (YWHA) beginning in 1929, and later founded the women’s division of the Combined Jewish Appeal. In 1952, the couple formed The Samuel and Saidye Bronfman Family Foundation to make grants primarily in support of education, the arts, heritage preservation, and Jewish community initiatives. Their daughter, Phyllis Lambert, founded the Canadian Centre for Architecture.

For years, Seagram was run by Samuel and Saidye's sons, Edgar and Charles Bronfman; and their grandson Edgar Bronfman Jr. oversaw the sale of company to Vivendi. Charles was also co-founder of the Historica Foundation of Canada and Heritage Minutes, as well as chairman and principal owner of the Montreal Expos.

The youngest daughter of Edgar Sr., Clare Bronfman, was a benefactor of Keith Raniere and has been sentenced to almost seven years for her role in the NXIVM case. Samuel's nephews Edward and Peter Bronfman (sons of Allan Bronfman), founded Edper Investments (now Brookfield Asset Management).

In 1994, the Bronfman family in collaboration with McGill University in Montreal, Quebec, supported the establishment of the McGill Institute for the Study of Canada (MISC), a nonpartisan Canadian research institute.

In 1922, Samuel's younger sister, Rose Bronfman (3 February 1898, Manitoba – 31 May 1988), was a substitute teacher and community activist. She married physician Maxwell Rady (born as Avraham Radishkevich, 24 November 1899 – 3 March 1964)—himself a Russian Jewish immigrant, who moved to Manitoba in 1893—and the couple remained notable philanthropists in Winnipeg. The University of Manitoba named its health sciences faculty and its College of Medicine in Rady's honour. The Rady Children’s Hospital in San Diego, and its Rady Children's Institute for Genomic Medicine, are named after the Rady family in honour of its largest donor, Ernest S. Rady (b. 1937), Rose and Max's son.

Jeremy and Eli Bronfman founded Lincoln Avenue Capital, a real estate investor and developer in affordable housing.

Works or publications 
 Seagram Museum collection,  at Hagley Museum and Library (finding aid)

Works about the Bronfman Family 
 Faith, Nicholas. 2006. The Bronfmans: The Rise and Fall of the House of Seagram. New York: St. Martin's Press.  
 Gittins, Susan. 1995. Behind Closed Doors: The Rise and Fall of Canada's Edper Bronfman and Reichmann Empires. Scarborough, ON: Prentice Hall Canada.  
 MacLeod, Roderick, and Eric John Abrahamson. 2010. Spirited Commitment The Samuel and Saidye Bronfman Family Foundation, 1952-2007. Montréal: McGill-Queen's University Press, for the Samuel and Saidye Bronfman Foundation. 
 Marrus, Michael R. 1991. Samuel Bronfman: The Life and Times of Seagram's Mr. Sam. Hanover: University Press of New England, for Brandeis University Press. 
 Newman, Peter Charles. 1978. Bronfman Dynasty: The Rothschilds of the New World. Toronto: McClelland and Stewart. 
 Republished: 1979. King of the castle: the making of a dynasty : Seagram's and the Bronfman empire. New York: Atheneum.
 Bronfman Family Dynasty (video), on Biography
Whisky man inside the dynasty of Samuel Bronfman (video). Kelowna, BC: FilmWest Associates, distributor. 1996.
 Video abstract: "Documents the rise to success of the Bronfman Family, who came to Canada as poor immigrants and became rich and powerful through selling (through Prohibition) and distilling whisky (Seagram Company). Family members recall the tough and determined character of Samuel who strove for social acceptance and respectability while alienating many of his family."
The novel Solomon Gursky Was Here, by Mordecai Richler, has been described as a thinly-veiled account of the Bronfman family.

Works by the Bronfman family 
 Bronfman, Charles, and Howard Green. 2016. Distilled: A Memoir of Family, Seagram, Baseball and Philanthropy.
Bronfman, Charles, and Jeffrey Solomon. 2010. The Art of Giving: Where the Soul Meets a Business Plan. San Francisco, CA: Jossey-Bass. 
 —— 2012. The Art of Doing Good: Where Passion Meets Action. San Francisco, CA: Jossey-Bass. 
 Bronfman, Edgar M. 1996. The Making of a Jew. New York: Putnam. 
 —— 1998. Good Spirits: The Making of a Businessman. New York: Putnam. 
 Bronfman, Edgar M., and Beth Zasloff. 2008. Hope, Not Fear: A Path to Jewish Renaissance. New York: St. Martin's Press. 
 Bronfman, Edgar M., and Catherine Whitney. 2002. The Third Act: Reinventing Yourself After Retirement. New York: G. P. Putnam. 
Bronfman, Edgar M., and Jan Aronson. 2012. The Bronfman Haggadah. New York: Rizzoli International Publications. . .
 Bronfman, Saidye. 1982. My Sam: A Memoir. Erin, ON: Porcupine's Quill. [Privately printed; one thousand copies have been printed.]
 Lambert, Phyllis, and Barry Bergdoll. 2013. Building Seagram. New Haven, CT ; London, UK : Yale University Press.

See also 
 Bronfman kidnapping
 Seagram Building
 Seagram House (now Martlet House)
 Cemp Investments
 Edper Investments
 The Samuel and Saidye Bronfman Family Foundation
 Rothschild family

References

External links
 Bronfman Family at The Canadian Encyclopedia
 Seagram Museum Collection RG 490 Brock University Library Digital Repository

Anglophone Quebec people
 
Canadian business families
Canadian socialites
Canadian drink distillers
Canadian people of Moldovan-Jewish descent
Canadian people of Russian-Jewish descent
Bronfman